The 1981–82 Yugoslav First Basketball League season was the 38th season of the Yugoslav First Basketball League, the highest professional basketball league in SFR Yugoslavia. The season ended with Cibona winning the league championship by beating Partizan two games to none in the playoffs final best-of-three series.

The season was another milestone for club basketball in Yugoslavia as the sport began to be played with playoffs at the end of the regular league season, meaning that postseason would determine the league champion rather than regular season as was the case prior to the 1981–82 campaign.

KK Partizan finished the regular season on top with an 18–4 record just ahead of Cibona's 17–5; additionally, Partizan won both regular season games against Cibona. The same two teams made the playoff finals, having the home court advantage at every stage of the playoffs. Heading into the final series, Partizan had the home court advantage, but lost it after game 1 at Belgrade's Hala sportova in front of a packed crowd of 4,000—a hard-fought contest that visiting Cibona won 108–112 after triple overtime. Game 2 was played in Zagreb on Cibona's home court and Cibona won it assuredly to claim its first-ever Yugoslav title.

Notable events

Moka Slavnić in Partizan jersey
The 1981–82 season featured the unusual sight of thirty-two-year-old Red Star Belgrade legendary point guard Moka Slavnić suiting up for their bitter crosstown rivals Partizan. Ever since leaving Red Star in acrimony four years earlier, Slavnić had been on such bad terms with the club's management that when he decided to return to his hometown in the twilight of his playing career, he controversially joined heated rivals Partizan instead of the club he made his name with and achieved legendary status in.

Slavnić's Partizan debut took place in week 7 versus Budućnost due to administrative issues with his player registration. He immediately proved valuable, assisting and organizing on offense on a roster that also featured another legendary veteran—thirty-year-old Dražen Dalipagić. In the first six games of the season that Partizan played without Slavnić, the team had a 3–3 record while with Slavnić they recorded only one loss in the next 16 league games until the end of the regular season, grabbing top spot ahead of the playoffs with an 18–4 record.

Regular season

League table

Playoff 
The first ever Yugoslav First League playoffs were played in the following format: 
 the top six regular season teams clinched an automatic playoff quarterfinals spot while 
 the 7th and 8th placed teams went to a play-in game against the Yugoslav Second League 2nd and 1st placed teams, respectively—with the winners of these two games (played at a neutral venue) clinching a playoff quarterfinals spot.

The top two teams from the 1981–82 Yugoslav Second League were KK Jugoplastika from Split and KK Kvarner from Rijeka. They thus faced Yugoslav First League clubs—8th placed KK Budućnost from Titograd and 7th placed KK Bosna from Sarajevo, respectively—with the winner of each game clinching a playoff spot.

Winning roster  
The winning roster of Cibona:
  Damir Pavličević
  Aco Petrović
  Mihovil Nakić
  Andro Knego
  Krešimir Ćosić
  Zoran Čutura
  Rajko Gospodnetić
  Adnan Bečić
  Tomislav Bevanda
  Mladen Cetinja
  Sven Ušić
  Srđan Savović

Coach:  Mirko Novosel

Qualification in 1982–83 season European competitions 

FIBA European Champions Cup
 Cibona (champions)
FIBA Cup Winner's Cup
 Iskra Olimpija (Cup finalist)
FIBA Korać Cup
 Partizan (1st)
 Crvena Zvezda (3rd)
 Zadar (4th)
 Šibenka (5th)

References

External links  
 Yugoslav First Basketball League Archive 

Yugoslav First Basketball League seasons
Yugo
Yugo